This is a collection of the results of various studies regarding the top contributors by business organisation to atmospheric greenhouse gases responsible for climate change.

Global emitters (1988 to 2015)
The following table shows the top 20 industrial greenhouse gas emitters from 1988 to 2015 according to a study conducted in 2017, based on the Carbon Majors Database.

Largest point source 
, Secunda CTL, a synthetic fuel plant in South Africa, is the world's largest single emitter, at 56.5 million tonnes of  a year. It is estimated that, if built, the proposed Afşin-Elbistan C power station in Turkey would have  emissions of more than 60 million tonnes per year.  the gas-fired power plant which emits the most is the Surgut-2 Power Station in Russia, with 31.5 million tonnes.

See also 
Attribution of recent climate change
List of countries by carbon dioxide emissions
List of countries by greenhouse gas emissions
Carbon footprint

Bibliography

References

External links 
 100 companies responsible for 71% of global emissions

Greenhouse gas